The Durbav or Sânpetru is a right tributary of the river Ghimbășel in Romania. Its source is in the Piatra Mare Mountains. It discharges into the Ghimbășel in Sânpetru.

References

Rivers of Romania
Rivers of Brașov County